Saybrook Breakwater Lighthouse is a sparkplug lighthouse in Connecticut,
United States, at Fenwick Point at the mouth of the Connecticut River near Old Saybrook, Connecticut. It is featured on the state's "Preserve the Sound" license plates.

"That outer lighthouse is the symbol of Old Saybrook," town First Selectman Michael Pace said in 2007, when the town was making plans to buy the lighthouse from the federal government.

The lighthouse is also known simply as "Breakwater Light" or "Outer Light". It is one of two built off Lynde Point in the nineteenth century. The other lighthouse, known as Lynde Point Light or more commonly as "Inner Light", is 75 years older than this lighthouse. The two lighthouses mark the harbor channel at the mouth of the Connecticut River.

History

The lighthouse has been in service since 1886.

In 2007, the federal government announced it would sell the lighthouse as part of the National Historic Lighthouse Preservation Program, which was created to transfer responsibility for maintenance of lighthouses to municipal governments or private entities. The Old Saybrook town government expressed an interest in the lighthouse, which is not expected to be transferred from the federal government until sometime in 2008 or 2009. The National Park Service will screen potential owners. The Coast Guard would continue to maintain the light while the new owners maintain the historic structure. The Coast Guard also owns the land on which the lighthouse sits, and transferring the land is not part of the preservation program.  As of January 14, 2014, the Minio family are the new private owners of the Old Saybrook Point Lighthouse.  Joseph C. Minio, Sr. and Dr. Christopher M. Minio are co-Lighthouse owners and keepers.

Head keepers

 Frank W. Paumlee (1886 – 1890)
 John G. Shipworth (1890 – 1896)
 George W. Fife (1896 – 1897)
 Robert A. Bishop (1897 – 1898)
 Nathaniel Dodge (1898)
 Thomas Burke (1898 – 1899)
 John Dahlman (1899 – 1907)
 Herbert S. Knowles (1907 – 1911)
 Simon Sfvorinich (1911 – 1912)
 Joseph F. Woods (1912 – at least 1917)
 John A. Davis (at least 1919 – 1920)
 Paul G. Peterson (1920 – at least 1921)
 Elwood L. Butler (at least 1923)
 Andrew A. McLintock (1932 – 1935)
 Sidney Z. Gross (at least 1938 – 1940)
 Roger H. Green (1940 – 1943)
 Thomas A. Buckridge (1943 – 1944)
 George E. Sheffield (1948 – 1953)

See also

 List of lighthouses in Connecticut
 List of lighthouses in the United States
 National Register of Historic Places listings in Middlesex County, Connecticut

References

External links

Lighthouses completed in 1886
Old Saybrook, Connecticut
Long Island Sound
Lighthouses on the National Register of Historic Places in Connecticut
Tourist attractions in Middlesex County, Connecticut
Transportation buildings and structures in Middlesex County, Connecticut
Historic American Engineering Record in Connecticut
National Register of Historic Places in Middlesex County, Connecticut